Santa Maria Addolorata ai Goranni is a church in the Collatino district of Rome, located at the intersection of Viale della Serenissima and Viale della  Venezia Giulia.

History
It was built between 1998 and 2001 to the designs of the architect Tommaso Sbardella. It was consecrated 17 March 2001 by Cardinal Camillo Ruini.

The church was established as a parish center by Cardinal Vicar Clemente Micara on 14 January 1958 by the decree Quartum iam annum. It was initially entrusted to the Servants of the Poor Missionaries. Since 1987 it has been staffed by the clergy of the diocese of Rome.

On 14 February 2015, Pope Francis instituted this building as a titular church.

List of Cardinal Protectors
 Kriengsak Kovitvanit, 14 February 2015 – present

References

Titular churches
Rome Q. XXII Collatino